Larson is a former city and current census-designated place in Burke County, North Dakota, United States. The population was 12 at the 2010 census.

Larson was founded in 1907. Both this town and nearby Columbus were named for Columbus Larson, an early postmaster who served the area.

The city government of Larson was dissolved in 2003. Even though it is now an unincorporated community, it was declared a census-designated place as part of the U.S. Census Bureau's Participant Statistical Areas Program on March 31, 2010. As a result, it was included in the 2010 census.

Geography
Larson is located at  (48.889308, -102.860606).

Demographics

As of the census of 2000, there were 17 people, 8 households, and 7 families residing in the city. The population density was 38.3 people per square mile (14.9/km2). There were 13 housing units at an average density of 29.3/sq mi (11.4/km2). The racial makeup of the city was 100.00% White.

There were 8 households, out of which 25.0% had children under the age of 18 living with them, 75.0% were married couples living together, and 12.5% were non-families. 12.5% of all households were made up of individuals, and 12.5% had someone living alone who was 65 years of age or older. The average household size was 2.13 and the average family size was 2.29.

In the city the population was spread out, with 11.8% under the age of 18, 11.8% from 25 to 44, 23.5% from 45 to 64, and 52.9% who were 65 years of age or older. The median age was 72 years. For every 100 females, there were 142.9 males. For every 100 females age 18 and over, there were 114.3 males.

The median income for a household in the city was $10,000, and the median income for a family was $9,250. The 2000 Census reported none of the population was part of the year-round workforce, with the bulk of the population receiving Social Security income or some sort of public assistance. The per capita income for the city was $7,263. Below the poverty line were 56.7% of people, 61.5% of families, 100.0% of those under 18 and 27.8% of those over 64.

References

Census-designated places in Burke County, North Dakota
Census-designated places in North Dakota
Populated places established in 1907
1907 establishments in North Dakota
Former municipalities in North Dakota
Unincorporated communities in North Dakota
Unincorporated communities in Burke County, North Dakota
Populated places disestablished in 2003